The Baymaster 18 is an American trailerable sailboat that was designed by Winthrop L. Warner as a cruiser and first built in 1968.

Production
The design was built by Regatta Plastics Co. in Houston, Texas, United States, but it is now out of production.

Design
The Baymaster 18 is a recreational sailboat, built predominantly of fiberglass, with wood trim. It has a fractional sloop rig, a raked stem, an angled transom, a transom-hung rudder controlled by a tiller and a fixed keel with a centerboard. It displaces  and carries  of ballast.

The boat is normally fitted with a small  outboard motor for docking and maneuvering.

The design has sleeping accommodation for four people, with a double berth in the cabin, and two in the cockpit under a boom tent.

Operational history
In a 2010 review Steve Henkel wrote, "The designer's intent was to place emphasis on safety and stability. Perhaps not surprisingly considering this, he has kept the main performance parameters (displacement, D/L, SA/D,) in the middle of the comp[etition] group. Best features: The large self-bailing cockpit has room enough to sleep two under a boom-tent, adding space for the other two crew in the cabin, though we think having four crew aboard overnight would be like sleeping four in a closet. That's not necessarily bad: we have met people who like to sleep four in a closet. In any case, she has the look of a classic little sailer and we suspect sails well. though we have never seen one sailing. Worst features: The Baymaster has the lowest headroom among her comp[etitor]s."

See also
List of sailing boat types

References

External links
Photos of Baymaster 18

Keelboats
1960s sailboat type designs
Sailing yachts
Trailer sailers
Sailboat types built by Regatta Plastics Co.
Sailboat type designs by Winthrop L. Warner